Sir Francis John Stapylton Habgood  (born 19 November 1964) is a retired senior British police officer. He was the Chief Constable of Thames Valley Police. He was appointed in April 2015. He is also a visiting fellow at Lady Margaret Hall, Oxford University. He holds the Queen's Police Medal.

His final day as Chief Constable of Thames Valley Police was 22 March 2019, retiring at the age of 54 after having served four years in the post, 15 years within that force, and more than 32 years in total within the police service.

Early life and education
Habgood was born on 19 November 1964 in Jedburgh, Scotland. His father was John Habgood, an Anglican priest who would later rise to become Archbishop of York and a life peer. He was educated at the Chorister School, Durham, and Repton School in Derbyshire. He studied mechanical engineering at Newcastle University (BSc) and applied criminology the University of Cambridge (Diploma).

Policing career
Habgood first served with West Yorkshire Police which he joined in 1987.

Habgood joined Thames Valley Police in January 2004 as Assistant Chief Constable (Specialist Operations). He was promoted to Deputy Chief Constable in October 2008. In February 2016, it was announced that he has also be appointed a visiting Fellow of Lady Margaret Hall, Oxford.

He was knighted in the 2020 New Year Honours for services to policing.

Later life
Since 2019, Habgood has been an independent chair of the Buckinghamshire Safeguarding Children Board and the Buckinghamshire Safeguarding Adults Board.

Family
Francis Habgood is the son of Lord Habgood, the former Archbishop of York, and is therefore entitled to the honorific "The Honourable". He is the grandson of  Lt.-Col. Arthur Henry Habgood RAMC and Vera Chetwynd-Stapylton.

Habgood is married to Dr. Nicolette Tamsin Campbell, and they have two sons.

Honours
In 2020, he was appointed a deputy lieutenant (DL) for Buckinghamshire.

References

1964 births
Living people
People educated at the Chorister School, Durham
People educated at Repton School
Alumni of Newcastle University
British Chief Constables
Knights Bachelor
Scottish recipients of the Queen's Police Medal
Sons of life peers
Deputy Lieutenants of Buckinghamshire